Ben Demery (born 19 September 1986) is an Australian Paralympic tandem cyclist with a vision impairment.  He comes from the New South Wales city of Newcastle. His pilot throughout his career has been Shaun Hopkins. He started competitive cycling in December 2005 and won a silver medal in the sprint and a bronze medal in the 1 km time trial at his first international competition, the 2006 IPC Cycling World Championships; that year he was named Lake Macquarie’s Sports Person of the Year. In the next year's UCI Para-cycling Track World Championships, he won silver medals in both the sprint and the 1 km time trial. At the 2008 Beijing Games, he won two silver medals in the Men's Sprint B VI 1–3 and Men's 1 km Time Trial B VI 1–3 events.

References

Paralympic cyclists of Australia
Australian male cyclists
Paralympic medalists in cycling
Cyclists at the 2008 Summer Paralympics
Medalists at the 2008 Summer Paralympics
Paralympic silver medalists for Australia
Paralympic cyclists with a vision impairment
Australian blind people
Sportspeople from Newcastle, New South Wales
1986 births
Living people